Jimramov is a market town in Žďár nad Sázavou District in the Vysočina Region of the Czech Republic. It has about 1,100 inhabitants. The historic town centre is well preserved and is protected by law as an urban monument zone.

Administrative parts
Villages of Benátky, Sedliště, Trhonice and Ubušín are administrative parts of Jimramov.

Geography
It is located in the Upper Svratka Highlands, on the border of the Žďárské vrchy mountain range. The river Svratka flows through Jimramov.

History
The first written mention of Jimramov is from 1361. A fortress in Jimramov is documented in 1392. In 1537, Jimramov was promoted to a market town by King Ferdinand I. Until 1588, the manor was owned by the Pernštejn family, who sold it to Pavel Katharin of Kathar. This nobleman chose Jimramov as his seat and had the town hall and a castle built here.

Jimramov reached the greatest prosperity in the 18th century. It became the cultural centre of evangelicals. From 1778 until 1948, the castle was owned by Italian noble family of Belcredi. In 1991, the Belcredi family regained the castle in restitution.

Sights

The Renaissance castle was built in 1593. The northern wing was added in the 18th century and the western wing in the 19th century. The castle complex includes the Neo-Gothic tomb of the Belcredi family from 1869. The castle is inaccessible to the public.

The Church of the Nativity of the Virgin Mary is as old as the market town. The tower was added in 1506 and the originally Romanesque building was Baroque rebuilt in 1707–1715. In the 18th century, it was connected by a corridor to the castle.

Notable people
Karel Slavíček (1678–1735), sinologist and scientist
Count Richard Belcredi (1823–1902), Austrian civil servant and statesman
Jan Karafiát (1846–1929), children's book writer
Alois Mrštík (1861–1925), writer
Vilém Mrštík (1863–1912), writer

Twin towns – sister cities

Jimramov is twinned with:
 Meyrargues, France

References

External links

Populated places in Žďár nad Sázavou District
Market towns in the Czech Republic